Urupês is a municipality in the state of São Paulo, Brazil. The city has a population of 13,888 inhabitants and an area of 323.7 km².

Urupês is located in the northwest of the state of São Paulo and it belongs to the Mesoregion of Novo Horizonte.

References

Municipalities in São Paulo (state)